Conomitra is a genus of sea snails, marine gastropod mollusks in the family Volutomitridae.

Species
Species within the genus Conomitra include:
 † Conomitra artata Lozouet, 1999 
 Conomitra boyeri R. Salisbury & Gori, 2019
 Conomitra carribeana Weinsbord, 1929
 † Conomitra flexuosa Lozouet, 1999 
 † Conomitra fusellina (Lamarck, 1803)
 † Conomitra fusoides (I. Lea, 1833) 
 † Conomitra hortiensis Lozouet, 1999 
 Conomitra leonardhilli Petuch, 1987
 Conomitra lindae Petuch, 1987
 † Conomitra peyreirensis Peyrot, 1928 
 † Conomitra praepinguis Lozouet, 1999 
 † Conomitra primornata Lozouet, 1999 
 † Conomitra strombodiformis Darragh, 2017 
Species brought into synonymy
 Conomitra blakeana Dall, 1889: synonym of Microvoluta blakeana (Dall, 1889)
 Conomitra intermedia Dall, 1890: synonym of Microvoluta intermedia (Dall, 1890)
 † Conomitra othoniana Finlay, 1924: synonym of † Volutomitra othoniana (Finlay, 1924)

References

 Lozouet, P., 1999. Nouvelles espèces de gastéropodes (Mollusca: Gastropoda) de l'Oligocène et du Miocène inférieur d'Aquitaine (sud-ouest de la France). Partie 2. Cossmanniana 6(1-2): 1-68
 Bouchet P. & Kantor Y. 2004. New Caledonia: the major centre of biodiversity for volutomitrid molluscs (Mollusca: Neogastropoda: Volutomitridae). Systematics and Biodiversity 1(4): 467-502.

External links
 Conrad T.A. (1865). Catalogue of the Eocene and Oligocene Testacea of the United States. American Journal of Conchology. 1(1): 1-35

Volutomitridae